Diamond Comics is an Indian comic books publisher and distribution company, headquartered in Delhi. It is the largest comic book distributor and publisher in India. Diamond Comics created several original Indian comic characters like Chacha Chaudhary, Billoo, Pinki and Motu Patlu.

Major characters of Diamond Comics

Cartoonist Pran's characters  
 Chacha Chaudhary, main characters: Chacha Chaudhary (Chachaji), Sabu (Chachaji's faithful assistant who has come from Jupiter), Bini (Chachaji's wife) Raaket (Chachaji's dog), Raakaa (a villain who drank an 'immortality' potion), Gobar Singh (a bandit), Dhamaka Singh (Gobar's aide)
 Billoo, main characters: Billoo, Joji, Gabdu, Bajrangi Pahalwan
 Pinki, main characters: Pinki, Grandma, Grandpa, Champu, Jhapatji
 Raman - a middle class office-worker, main characters: Raman, Kamli, Khalifa, Moga Singh, Office Boss
Shrimati Ji - a mid-class simple housewife
 Daabu
 Channi Chachi
 Soni-Sampat - a mid-class young couple

Teamed-up characters 
Chacha-Bhatija
 Sunny Gill & the Agents of Sniff (based on Sniff film) (co-operation with Eros's Trinity Pictures)
 Agniputra-Abhay
 Tau Ji (with Rumjhum)
 Motu-Patlu
 Motu-Chhotu
 Chhotu-Lamboo
 Lamboo-Motu
 Anderam-Danderam
 Alturam-Falturam
 Manglu Madari - Bander Bihari
 Mama-Bhanja
 Raajan-Iqbal
 Fauladi Singh (with Lamboo, Dr. John)
 Chacha Chaudhry (With Sabu)

Fun/family characters 
 Ankur
 Chimpoo
 Paltu the mouse
 Picklu the teenage rabbit
 Meeku the pup

Action figures 
 Mahabali Shaka
 Jasoos Chakram
 Dynamite
 Jimmy Hendricks

Foreign characters (licensed) 
 Phantom
 Flash Gordon
 Mandrake
 James Bond
 He-Man
 Tarzan
 Spider-Man
 Superman
 Batman
 Archie Andrews
 Jughead Jones
 Garfield

Advertisements/endorsement/TV series 
 Shaktimaan (Based on the popular TV serial for children, Shaktimaan starring Mukesh Khanna, an Indian  Superhero.)
 Rasna Genie (Rasna is one of the biggest drinks in India.)
 Kapil Dev (Prithvi Ke Rakshak - Action Grahvasi) (Comic produce as an ad campaign for Action Shoes)
 Big Babool Children (Distributed free with Perfetti's popular Big Babool Bubble Gum)
 Captain Vyom (Comic version of a space adventure TV series of the same name starring Milind Soman in the title role)

3D comics 
 Diamond Comics 3D Series

List of Diamond Comics

See also
Pran Kumar Sharma

References

External links
 
 
 
 
 

 
Comic book publishing companies of India
Book distributors